Cemali Sertel (born 6 January 2000) is a Turkish professional footballer who plays as a left-back for Süper Lig club Antalyaspor, on loan from İstanbul Başakşehir.

Professional career
Sertel began his professional career with Eskişehirspor. On 29 January 2019, Sertel signed a professional contract with İstanbul Başakşehir, before returning to Eskişehirspor on a season-long loan. Sertel made his senior debut with Başakşehir in a 2–0 Süper Lig loss to Hatayspor on 14 September 2020.

On 25 July 2022, Sertel was sent on a one-season loan to Antalyaspor.

References

External links
 
 

2000 births
Living people
People from Samandağ
Turkish footballers
Turkey youth international footballers
İstanbul Başakşehir F.K. players
Eskişehirspor footballers
Çaykur Rizespor footballers
Antalyaspor footballers
Süper Lig players
TFF First League players
Association football fullbacks
Sportspeople from Hatay